Tenshindon, also known as tenshinhan, is a Japanese Chinese specialty, consisting of a crab meat omelette on rice, named after Tianjin in northern China.

See also 
 Egg foo young

References

Japanese egg dishes
Omelettes
Japanese fusion cuisine
Chinese fusion cuisine
Japanese Chinese cuisine